Ranjeeta Shrestha is a Nepalese politician and member of the Nagrik Unmukti Party. She was elected in 2022 from Kailali 1 to the House of Representatives.

References 

Nagrik Unmukti Party politicians
Living people
Nepal MPs 2022–present
1983 births